FC Sokol is a Bulgarian football club based in Markovo, Plovdiv Province, that currently plays in the South-East Third League, the third tier of Bulgarian football. It was founded in 1928.

Current squad

References

External links 
Club Profile at bgclubs.eu

Sokol Markovo
Association football clubs established in 1928
1928 establishments in Bulgaria